The 14th State Affairs Commission (SAC) of North Korea was elected by the 1st Session of the 14th Supreme People's Assembly on 11 April 2019.

Members

1st SPA Session (2019–20)

3rd SPA Session (2020–onwards)

References

Citations

Bibliography
Books:
 

14th Supreme People's Assembly
State Affairs Commission
2019 establishments in North Korea